Christian Baptiste (born 18 June 1962) is a French politician who was elected to represent Guadeloupe's 2nd constituency in the 2022 legislative election. Baptise ran as a member of the Progressive Democratic Party of Guadeloupe, a left-wing party affiliated with the New Ecologic and Social People's Union (NUPES) coalition.

Biography 
Baptiste formerly served as mayor of Sainte-Anne, Guadeloupe. In 2022, Baptiste defeated incumbent Justine Benin to become the new member of the National Assembly for Guadeloupe's 2nd constituency. He received 58.65% of the vote versus the 41.35% received by Benin.

References 

Living people
1962 births
21st-century French politicians
Black French politicians
Deputies of the 16th National Assembly of the French Fifth Republic
Guadeloupean politicians
Mayors of places in Guadeloupe